Club Bàsquet Mallorquí, also known as Bàsquet Mallorca was a professional basketball team based in Inca, Balearic Islands, Spain.

History
Bàsquet Mallorca was founded in 2008 as a merger of two teams from Balearic Islands: 
Club Bàsquet Inca (former LEB Oro team)
Club Bàsquet Muro (former LEB Plata team)

The team started playing in LEB Oro, but in the summer of 2010 they were relegated to LEB Plata because of not submitting all documentation on time. In that 2010–11 season, Mallorca promoted to LEB Oro after winning the final playoffs to BC Andorra. In the last game, Mallorca won 67–66 after Andreu Matalí failed two free shots with only one second left.

In 2012, the club resigned to play any competition and announced it would be probably dissolved, but in September 2012 the Spanish Basketball Federation finally invited it to join Liga EBA.

At the end of the season, Bàsquet Mallorca was dissolved and two new clubs appeared in Inca to substitute it: Former LEB Oro team Bàsquet Inca was re-founded and the youth system separated from the main club to create the new Bàsquet Ciutat d'Inca.

Sponsorship naming 
Bàsquet Mallorca had denominations through the years due to its sponsorship:

 Iberostar Mallorca Bàsquet: 2011 (only during LEB Plata promotion playoffs)
 Logitravel Básquet Mallorca: 2011–12
 WifiBaleares Mallorca Bàsquet: 2012–2013

Season by season

Notable past players
 Sérgio Ramos
/ Cody Töpper
 Marques Whippy
  Sotiris Manolopoulos

See also
CB Inca

References and notes

External links
Bàsquet Mallorca Official Website

Defunct basketball teams in Spain
Former LEB Oro teams
Liga EBA teams
Basketball teams established in 2008
Inca, Spain
Former LEB Plata teams
Basketball teams disestablished in 2013
Basketball teams in the Balearic Islands
Sport in Mallorca